Senator Waite may refer to:

Henry Matson Waite (judge) (1787–1869), Connecticut State Senate 
Morrison Waite (1816–1888), Ohio State Senate

See also
John T. Wait (1811–1899), Connecticut State Senate